Water allergy is a popular name for some diseases where the skin becomes sensitive to contact with water, such as:

 Aquagenic pruritus
 Aquagenic urticaria